Noah Hanifin (born January 25, 1997) is an American professional ice hockey defenseman for the Calgary Flames of the National Hockey League (NHL). He has previously played for the Carolina Hurricanes, who drafted him fifth overall in the 2015 NHL Entry Draft.

Playing career

Amateur
Hanifin was to be a top-three pick for the 2015 NHL Entry Draft, and the number-one rated defenseman. He was picked fifth overall by the Carolina Hurricanes. Hanifin played for the USA Hockey's U17 program based out of Ann Arbor, Michigan, but was added to the U18 national team as an underage player, helping to lead Team USA to the gold medal at the 2014 IIHF World U18 Championships. He was the highest-scoring American defenseman of the tournament with one goal and five points. After fast-tracking his high school graduation, Hanifin matriculated at Boston College as a 17-year-old, playing for the Eagles and becoming the second-youngest player in the team's history.

Professional

Carolina Hurricanes
Hanifin was selected fifth overall by the Carolina Hurricanes in the 2015 NHL Entry Draft. On July 11, 2015, Hanifin signed a three-year, entry-level contract with the Hurricanes forgoing the remainder of his college eligibility.  He made his NHL debut October 8, 2015, against the Nashville Predators. Hanifin scored his first NHL goal against Anton Khudobin of the Anaheim Ducks on November 16, 2015. Hanifin finished his rookie season with 4 goals and 22 points in 79 games.

On January 15, 2018, Hanifin was selected as the sole representative of the Hurricanes at the 2018 NHL All-Star Game. On March 19, 2018, Hanifin was diagnosed with a concussion and was ruled out indefinitely. After missing just three games, Hanifin returned to the Hurricanes' lineup on March 24 in a 5–2 win over the Ottawa Senators. Hanifin scored what ended up being the game-winning goal. Despite the Hurricanes not qualifying for the 2018 Stanley Cup playoffs, Hanifin ended the regular season with a career-high 10 goals and 32 points.

Calgary Flames
On June 23, 2018, Hanifin was traded to the Calgary Flames (along with teammate Elias Lindholm) in exchange for Dougie Hamilton, Micheal Ferland, and prospect Adam Fox. On August 30, the Flames signed Hanifin to a six-year, $29.7 million contract extension worth $4.95 million annually.

On February 6, 2021, in a regular season game against the Edmonton Oilers, Hanifin became the sixth youngest U.S.-born player to reach the milestone of 400 NHL games played. Calgary defeated Edmonton 6-4.

International play
Hanifin has represented the United States internationally at the 2014 U17 World Hockey Challenge, 2014 U18 IIHF World Championships, the 2015 World Junior Championships, the 2016 IIHF World Championship, and the 2017 IIHF World Championship.

Personal life
Born to Bob and Tina Hanifin, Hanifin grew up in Norwood, Massachusetts, with two younger siblings: Cole and Lily. His father was diagnosed with colon and kidney cancer when Hanifin was 13. Growing up, he attended Saint Sebastian's School, where he played for the varsity team in the eighth grade.

Career statistics

Regular season and playoffs

International

Awards and achievements

References

External links

1997 births
Living people
American expatriate ice hockey players in Canada
American men's ice hockey defensemen
Boston College Eagles men's ice hockey players
Calgary Flames players
Carolina Hurricanes draft picks
Carolina Hurricanes players
Ice hockey people from Boston
National Hockey League first-round draft picks
National Hockey League All-Stars
People from Norwood, Massachusetts
USA Hockey National Team Development Program players